Agriphila indivisellus is a species of moth in the family Crambidae described by Turati and Zanon in 1922. It is found on Crete and in North Africa.

References

Moths described in 1922
Crambini
Moths of Europe
Moths of Africa